The Kunapalari frog (Neobatrachus kunapalari) is a species of frog in the family Limnodynastidae.
It is endemic to Australia.
Its natural habitats are temperate shrubland, Mediterranean-type shrubby vegetation, subtropical or tropical dry lowland grassland, and intermittent freshwater marshes.

References

Neobatrachus
Amphibians of Western Australia
Taxonomy articles created by Polbot
Amphibians described in 1986
Frogs of Australia